Phyllonorycter yamadai is a moth of the family Gracillariidae. It is known from Nepal.

The wingspan is 5.5–6 mm.

The larvae feed on Engelhardia spicata. They mine the leaves of their host plant. The mine has the form of a very small blotch occurring upon the lower surface of the leaf, situated on the space between two lateral veins or rarely along the leaf-margin. It is elliptical to quadrangular in form. The lower epidermis of the leaf on the mining part is dark brown, slightly constricted longitudinally, but without distinct wrinkles or ridges even in accomplished condition.

References

yamadai
Moths of Asia
Moths described in 1973